Cotana albomaculata is a moth in the family Eupterotidae. It was described by George Thomas Bethune-Baker in 1904. It is found in New Guinea.

The wingspan is about 58 mm. Both wings are pale, semitransparent reddish, the forewings have a large ovate white spot at the end of the cell and there is a whitish scalloped subterminal stripe, the scallops extended into spear-head points in the apical area. The hindwings are similar to the forewings but without the cell spot.

References

Moths described in 1904
Eupterotinae